Serpil Yassıkaya is a Turkish female boxer competing in the pinweight (46 kg) division.

Achievements
2006 Women's European Union Amateur Boxing Championships Porto Torres, Italy 46 kg - 
2008 Women's European Union Amateur Boxing Championships Liverpool, England 46 kg - 
2009 Women's European Union Amateur Boxing Championships  Pazardzhik, Bulgaria 46 kg - 
2010 Women's European Union Amateur Boxing Championships Keszthely, Hungary 46 kg -

References 

Turkish women boxers
Living people
Date of birth unknown
Light-flyweight boxers
European champions for Turkey
Year of birth missing (living people)
21st-century Turkish sportswomen